A canonical election, in the canon law of the Latin Church of the Catholic Church, is the designation of a suitable candidate to a vacant ecclesiastical office by a vote of a collegial body. One example for a canonical election would be the election of a pope by the cardinals in the conclave.

Usually confirmation of the election by a competent authority is required. The competent authority cannot withhold confirmation if the designated candidate is canonically suitable for the office and the election has been conducted validly.

References

Bibliography
Fernando della Rocca, "Manual of Canon Law" (Milwaukee: The Bruce Publishing Company, 1959).

Catholic Church legal terminology